Real estate investing involves the purchase, management and sale or rental of real estate for profit. Someone who actively or passively invests in real estate is called a real estate entrepreneur or a real estate investor. Some investors actively develop, improve or renovate properties to make more money from them.

History 
During the 1980s, real estate investment funds became increasingly involved in international real estate developed. This shift led to real estate becoming a global asset class. Investing in real estate in foreign countries often requires specialized knowledge of the real estate market in that country. As international real estate investment became increasingly common in the early 21st century, the availability and quality of information regarding international real estate markets increased.
Real estate is one of the primary areas of investment in China, where an estimated 70% of household wealth is invested in real estate.

Overview

Types of real estate investments 
Real estate is divided into several broad categories, including residential property, commercial property and industrial property.

Valuation 

Real estate markets in most countries are not as organized or efficient as markets for other, more liquid investment instruments. Individual properties are unique to themselves and not directly interchangeable, which makes evaluating investments less certain. Unlike other investments, real estate is fixed in a specific location and derives much of its value from that location. Industrial real estate With residential real estate, the perceived safety of a neighbourhood and the number of services or amenities nearby can increase the value of a property. For this reason, the economic and social situation in an area is often a major factor in determining the value of its real estate.

Property valuation is often the preliminary step taken during a real estate investment. Information asymmetry is commonplace in real estate markets, where one party may have more accurate information regarding the actual value of the property. Real estate investors typically use a variety of real estate appraisal techniques to determine the value of properties prior to purchase.  This typically includes gathering documents and information about the property, inspecting the physical property, and comparing it to the market value of similar properties. A common method of valuing real estate is by dividing its net operating income by its capitalization rate, or CAP rate.

Numerous national and international real estate appraisal associations exist for the purpose of standardizing property valuation. Some of the larger of these include the Appraisal Institute, the Royal Institution of Chartered Surveyors and the International Valuation Standards Council.

Investment properties are often purchased from a variety of sources, including market listings, real estate agents or brokers, banks, government entities such as Fannie Mae, public auctions, sales by owners, and real estate investment trusts.

Financing 
Real estate assets are typically expensive, and investors will generally not pay the entire amount of the purchase price of a property in cash. Usually, a large portion of the purchase price will be financed using some sort of financial instrument or debt, such as a mortgage loan collateralized by the property itself. The amount of the purchase price financed by debt is referred to as leverage. The amount financed by the investor's own capital, through cash or other asset transfers, is referred to as equity. The ratio of leverage to total appraised value (often referred to as "LTV", or loan to value for a conventional mortgage) is one mathematical measure of the risk an investor is taking by using leverage to finance the purchase of a property. Investors usually seek to decrease their equity requirements and increase their leverage, so that their return on investment is maximized. Lenders and other financial institutions usually have minimum equity requirements for real estate investments they are being asked to finance, typically on the order of 20% of appraised value. Investors seeking low equity requirements may explore alternate financing arrangements as part of the purchase of a property (for instance, seller financing, seller subordination, private equity sources, etc.)

If the property requires substantial repair, traditional lenders like banks will often not lend on a property and the investor may be required to borrow from a private lender utilizing a short term bridge loan like a hard money loan from a Hard money lender. Hard money loans are usually short-term loans where the lender charges a much higher interest rate because of the higher risk nature of the loan. Hard money loans are typically at a much lower loan-to-value ratio than conventional mortgages.

Some real estate investment organizations, such as real estate investment trusts (REITs) and some pension funds and hedge funds, have large enough capital reserves and investment strategies to allow 100% equity in the properties that they purchase. This minimizes the risk which comes from leverage but also limits potential ROI.

By leveraging the purchase of an investment property, the required periodic payments to service the debt create an ongoing (and sometimes large) negative cash flow beginning from the time of purchase.  This is sometimes referred to as the carry cost or "carry" of the investment.  To be successful, real estate investors must manage their cash flows to create enough positive income from the property to at least offset the carry costs.

With the signing of the JOBS Act in April 2012 by President Obama there was an easing on investment solicitations. A newer method of raising equity in smaller amounts is through real estate crowdfunding which can pool accredited and/or non-accredited investors together in a special purpose vehicle for all or part of the equity capital needed for the acquisition. Fundrise was the first company to crowdfund a real estate investment in the United States.

Sources of investment returns 
Real estate properties may generate revenue through a number of means, including net operating income, tax shelter offsets, equity build-up, and capital appreciation. 
Net operating income is the sum of all profits from rents and other sources of ordinary income generated by a property, minus the sum of ongoing expenses, such as maintenance, utilities, fees, taxes, and other expenses. Rent is one of the main sources of revenue in commercial real estate investment. Tenants pay an agreed upon sum to landlords in exchange for the use of real property, and may also pay a portion of upkeep or operating expenses on the property.

Tax shelter offsets occur in one of three ways: depreciation (which may sometimes be accelerated), tax credits, and carryover losses which reduce tax liability charged against income from other sources for a period of 27.5 years.  Some tax shelter benefits can be transferable, depending on the laws governing tax liability in the jurisdiction where the property is located.  These can be sold to others for a cash return or other benefits.

Equity build-up is the increase in the investor's equity ratio as the portion of debt service payments devoted to principal accrue over time.  Equity build-up counts as positive cash flow from the asset where the debt service payment is made out of income from the property, rather than from independent income sources.

Capital appreciation is the increase in the market value of the asset over time, realized as a cash flow when the property is sold.  Capital appreciation can be very unpredictable unless it is part of a development and improvement strategy.  The purchase of a property for which the majority of the projected cash flows are expected from capital appreciation (prices going up) rather than other sources is considered speculation rather than investment.

One source of investment returns is AirBNB rental arbitrage. This is the process that focuses on buying properties or leveraging other peoples properties by sub-leasing and then renting them out on websites such as AirBNB. There are pros and cons to this investment type. You have to find properties in high destination areas to ensure that you will have enough bookings to cover the recurring costs and initial investment. There is potential to make a much larger return when compared to simply renting out a property for a long term stays. However, there is much more upkeep and much more potential for damage and unwanted costs when doing short-term rentals due to the large amount of different people using the home constantly.

Foreclosure investment

Some individuals and companies focus their investment strategy on purchasing properties that are in some stage of foreclosure. A property is considered in pre-foreclosure when the homeowner has defaulted on their mortgage loan. Formal foreclosure processes vary by state and may be judicial or non-judicial, which affects the length of time the property is in the pre-foreclosure phase. Once the formal foreclosure processes are underway, these properties can be purchased at a public sale, usually called a foreclosure auction or sheriff's sale. If the property does not sell at the public auction, then ownership of the property is returned to the lender. Properties at this phase are called Real Estate Owned, or REOs.

Once a property is sold at the foreclosure auction or as an REO, the lender may keep the proceeds to satisfy their mortgage and any legal costs that they incurred minus the costs of the sale and any outstanding tax obligations.

The foreclosing bank or lending institution has the right to continue to honor tenant leases (if there are tenants in the property) during the REO phase but usually, the bank wants the property vacant in order to sell it more easily.

Buy, rehab, rent & refinance 
Buy, rehab, rent, refinance (BRRR) is a real estate investment strategy, used by real estate investors who have experience renovating or rehabbing properties to "flip" houses. BRRR is different from "flipping" houses. Flipping houses implies buying a property and quickly selling it for a profit, with or without repairs. BRRR is a long-term investment strategy that involves renting out a property and letting it appreciate in value before selling it. Renting out a BRRR property provides a stable passive income source that is used to cover mortgage payments while home price appreciation increases future capital gains.

Impact
According to Lima et al. (2022), in Ireland, the financialization of rental housing, which includes the entry of institutional investors into urban rental housing markets, contributed to structural factors that create homelessness, directly, by worsening affordability and security in the private rental market, and indirectly by influencing state policy.

See also

References